Susanti is a surname. Notable people with the surname include:

Aries Susanti Rahayu (born 1995), Indonesian climbing athlete
Susi Susanti (born 1971), Indonesian badminton player